Jack Prior (2 July 1904 – 1982) was an English professional footballer who played as a winger.

References

1904 births
1982 deaths
People from Choppington
Footballers from Northumberland
English footballers
Association football wingers
Choppington Colliery F.C. players
Blyth Spartans A.F.C. players
Sunderland A.F.C. players
Grimsby Town F.C. players
Ashington A.F.C. players
Mansfield Town F.C. players
Stalybridge Celtic F.C. players
Pressed Steel F.C. players
English Football League players